Nelson Beach is an unincorporated community within the Rural Municipality of Hoodoo No. 401, Saskatchewan, Canada.

See also

 List of communities in Saskatchewan

References

External links

Hoodoo No. 401, Saskatchewan
Unincorporated communities in Saskatchewan
Division No. 15, Saskatchewan